Barnidipine (INN; also known as mepirodipine) is a calcium channel blocker which belongs to the dihydropyridine (DHP) group of calcium channel blockers. It is used in the treatment of hypertension.

References

Calcium channel blockers
Dihydropyridines
Pyrrolidines
Carboxylate esters
Nitrobenzenes
Methyl esters